Picket Hill is a hamlet next to Picket Post in the New Forest National Park of Hampshire, England. It lies on the outskirts of Ringwood.

Villages in Hampshire
Ringwood, Hampshire